Amblyseius tubae is a species of mite in the family Phytoseiidae. It is found in Europe.

References

tubae
Articles created by Qbugbot
Animals described in 1970
Taxa named by Wolfgang Karg